In economics, land comprises all naturally occurring resources as well as geographic land. Examples include particular geographical locations, mineral deposits, forests, fish stocks, atmospheric quality, geostationary orbits, and portions of the electromagnetic spectrum. Supply of these resources is fixed.

Factor of production
Land is considered one of the three factors of production (also sometimes called the three producer goods) along with capital, and labor. Natural resources are fundamental to the production of all goods, including capital goods. While the particular role of land in the economy was extensively debated in classical economics it played a minor role in the neoclassical economics dominant in the 20th century. Income derived from ownership or control of natural resources is referred to as rent.

Ownership 

Because no man created the land, it does not have a definite original proprietor, owner or user.  

As a consequence, conflicting claims on geographic locations and mineral deposits have historically led to disputes over their economic rent and contributed to many civil wars and revolutions.

In the context of geographic locations the resulting conflict is regularly understood as the land question (see e.g. United Kingdom, South Africa, Canada).

Addressing the land question

Land reform 
Land reform programs are designed to redistribute possession and/or use of geographic land.

Georgism
Georgists hold that this implies a perfectly inelastic supply curve (i.e., zero elasticity), suggesting that a land value tax that recovers the rent of land for public purposes would not affect the opportunity cost of using land, but would instead only decrease the value of owning it.  This view is supported by evidence that although land can come on and off the market, market inventories of land show if anything an inverse relationship to price (i.e., negative elasticity).

Significance
Land plays an important role in advanced economies. In the UK the "non-produced asset of land" accounts for 51% of the country's total net worth, implying that it plays a more important role in the economy than capital.

Academic 
Some United Kingdom and commonwealth universities offer a courses in land economy, where economics is studied alongside law, business regulation, surveying and the built and natural environments.  This mode of study at Cambridge dates back to 1917 when William Cecil Dampier suggested the creation of a school of rural economy at the university.

Accounting
As a tangible asset land is represented in accounting as a fixed asset or a capital asset.

Sustainability 
The sustainable use of land is the focus of some economic theories.

See also

Economics of Land Degradation Initiative
Factors of production
Land consumption
Land monopoly
Land reform
Land value tax
Means of production
Property rights (economics)
Real estate appraisal
Social metabolism

References

Further reading
 Anthony C. Fisher (1987). "Natural resources," The New Palgrave: A Dictionary of Economics, v. 3, pp. 612–14.
 João Pedro Galhano Alves  (2009). "The artificial simulacrum world. The geopolitical elimination of communitary land use and its effects on our present global condition", Eloquent Books, New York, USA, 71 pp.
 Pierre Coulomb (1994). "De la terre à l’état: Eléments pour un cours de politique agricole", ENGREF, INRA-ESR Laboratoire d’Economie des Transitions, Montpellier, France, 47 pp.

Environmental economics
Urban economics
Factors of production
Georgism
Land value taxation
Natural resources
Production economics